Dennis Eveland born July 3, 1952 is an American guitarist, electronic musician, bassist, composer, and engineer. He started performing at the age of 12.
His first band, The Berlin Airlift, opened for Ted Nugent and the Amboy Dukes, Parliament and Funkadelic, and the Red, White & Blues Band.

Biography
In 1972 Eveland moved to Los Angeles, CA and worked at Bud Friedman's Improv Comedy Club, opening for comedians with his "Django"-esque acoustic duo, Samartino and Eveland.

In 1978 he joined the Shieks of Shake, a popular local Los Angeles blues/psychedelia band, with Louis Lista (harp and vocals), John Sanborn (guitar), Paul Body (drums) as bassist, who released one 45 "Bullets in My Gun" on Mystic Records. The Shieks of Shake shared billings with Captain Beefheart, the Slits, X, the Blasters, Wall of Voodoo, Billy Vera and the Beaters, The Plugz, and many other LA based groups.

From 1978–1984 he performed on and off with the X-Streams a Phoenix-based ska/reggae band with Kurt Mayberry (guitar) Bob Steinhilber (drums) Lorainne Springer (vocals) Peter Tessensohn (bass) Mike Tempo (percussion).

Dennis formed the band The Hand with Detroit-based members John Jones (vocal) Greg Sieja (bass) Wayne Tarasoff (drums) Mike Cosola (guitar) Jeff Teitell (Keyboards) and Bruce Teitell (Vocals & Percussion).

Addition: 7"-45 rpm stereo, dated 1983 Handsongs Publishing (Canoga Park, CA) # M-1235-6. Side A) "One Shot Deal" (3:32). Side B) "Love Hurts" (3:40). Players: Yusra Laughlin- vocals. Dennis Eveland- guitar. Wayne Tarasoff- drums. Dan Gruich- bass. Jeff Teitell- keyboards. Bruce Teitell- background vocals. Recorded at Motor City Studios. produced and arranged by Dennis Eveland.

A reformation of The Hand added Harvest Eveland (vocals) and a 45 entitled "One Shot Deal" was released on Madhouse Records.

Turning to electronic music and film scoring, He composed and performed on the documentaries "The Making of the Abyss" and The Making of "No Escape".
Titles from these compositions also appeared on a CD release "No Pressure" on Wildcat Records.

With Harvey Robert Kubernik and New Alliance Records, a spoken word project, Dennis produced, engineered and performed on releases with Scott Richardson, Pleasant Gehman, Linda Albertano, Paul Body, Louis Lista, Wanda Coleman, Michelle Norte, Michelle T. Clinton, Marisela Norte, Bill Mohr, Joel Lipman, Harry E. Northup, and Tommy Swerdlow.

Scott Richardson's CD Tornado Souvenirs featured vocal tracks with Ray Manzarek, Ron Ashton, Robert Mitchum, and Jane Greer. Dennis supplied the electronic music tracts for Scott's "White Man In The Middle" and Jane Greer's "Eve's Lament".

Discography
1981 The Hand            "One Shot Deal"

1982 The Hand            "Love Hurts"

1993 Dennis Eveland      "No Pressure"

1993 Scott Richardson    "Tornado Souvenirs"

1993 Joel Lipman         "Down Your Street"

1993 Innings & Quarters" "Compilation"

1994 Pleasant Gehman     "Ruined"

1994 Marisela Norte      "Note and Word"

1994 Bill Mohr           "Vehemence"

1994 Michelle T. Clinton "Blood as a Bright Color"

1994 Louie Lista         "To Sleep with the Lights On"

1994 Linda J. Albertano  "Skin"

1994 Joel Lipman         "Down Your Street"

1993 Harry E. Northup    "Personal Crime"

1994 Paul Body           "Love is Like Rasputin"

1994 Tommy Swerdlow      "Artaud and Exactas"

1993 Wanda Coleman       "High Priestess of Word"

1995 Hollywood Joe       "Jack of Hearts"

2012 The Sheiks of Shake "Live at the ON Club"

2012 Ludar               "Live at Luna Park

References

 
 Answers.com
 Artist Direct

External links
 

1952 births
Living people
Place of birth missing (living people)
Guitarists from Los Angeles
American male guitarists
20th-century American guitarists
20th-century American male musicians